Shlomo Yitzhaki is  an Israeli economist and the Sam M. Cohodas Professor Emeritus of Agricultural economics at the Hebrew University of Jerusalem. In 2002-2012 he served as the chief statistician (the director) of the Israeli Central Bureau of Statistics.

Education and career
Yitzhaki earned his Ph.D. in economics from the Hebrew University in 1976. He spent a year as a visiting scholar at Harvard University, and then he returned to Jerusalem as a lecturer in 1977. In 1981–1982 he worked as a research economist at the National Bureau of Economic Research. In 1982 he returned to academia as a senior lecturer at Hebrew University, where he has remained ever since. He joined the faculty as an associate professor in 1990, and earned his tenure in 1993. In 2008 he was granted emeritus status.

Yitzhaki first consulted as an economist at the World Bank in 1986, and was appointed director of the Central Bureau of Statistics in 2002. He represents Israel at the International Statistical Institute. He has also consulted with the governments of many developing nations and is considered a "world-class expert" regarding the design of tax systems. In 2008 he chaired the Yitzhaki Committee examining the rise of poverty in Israel.

Publications
The following partial list of publications is largely taken from the Hebrew University Faculty Directory.
2003, "Gini's Mean difference: a superior measure of variability for non-normal distributions", Metron - International Journal of Statistics
2002, "Decomposing World Income Distribution: Does the World Have a Middle Class?", Review of Income and Wealth
1998, "More than a Dozen Alternative Ways of Spelling Gini", Journal of Economic Inequality
1996, "Dalton improving tax reform when households are heterogeneous", Journal of Public Economics
1995, "Dalton improving indirect tax reform", American Economic Review
1995, "Equity, equality and welfare", European Economic Review
1995, "Changing ranks and the inequality impacts of taxes and transfers", National Tax Journal
1991, "Calculating jackknife variance estimators for parameters of the Gini method", Journal of Business & Economic Statistics
1991,"Income stratification and income inequality", Review of Income and Wealth
1991,"Welfare dominance: An application to commodity taxation", American Economic Review
1987,"On the Excess Burden of Tax Evasion", Public Finance Review
1985,"Income inequality effects by income source: a new approach and applications to the United States", The Review of Economics and Statistics

References

20th-century Israeli economists
Living people
Iraqi Jews
21st-century Israeli economists
Israeli Jews
1944 births